Liutuan may refer to these towns in China:

Liutuan, Heilongjiang (六团), in Yanshou County, Heilongjiang
Liutuan, Shandong (柳疃), in Changyi, Shandong